Jim Prior (1923 – 12 November 1980) was an Irish sportsperson.  He played hurling with his local clubs Borris–Ileigh and Faughs and was a member of the Dublin senior inter-county team from 1944 until 1957.

References

Teams

1923 births
1980 deaths
Borris-Ileigh hurlers
Faughs hurlers
Tipperary inter-county hurlers
Dublin inter-county hurlers
Leinster inter-provincial hurlers